Brill–Zinsser disease is a delayed relapse of epidemic typhus, caused by Rickettsia prowazekii. After a patient contracts epidemic typhus from the fecal matter of an infected louse (Pediculus humanus), the rickettsia can remain latent and reactivate months or years later, with symptoms similar to or even identical to the original attack of typhus, including a maculopapular rash. At such times, typhus can be transmitted to other individuals through fecal matter of the louse vector, and generate a new epidemic of the disease.

See also
 Nathan Edwin Brill
 Hans Zinsser
 Tick-borne lymphadenopathy
 List of cutaneous conditions

References

External links 

Bacterium-related cutaneous conditions
Epidemic typhus